Mitchell Lee Wiggins (born September 28, 1959) is an American former professional basketball player who played the shooting guard position.

Early life
Wiggins attended North Lenoir High School in LaGrange, North Carolina.

College career 
He played collegiately at Truett-McConnell College, Clemson University and Florida State University.

Wiggins averaged 23 points and nine rebounds per game during his two seasons at Florida State.

Professional career

Chicago Bulls (1983-1984) 
Wiggins was selected by the Indiana Pacers as the 23rd overall pick of the 1983 NBA draft. He never played for the Pacers, spending his rookie year playing in all 82 regular season games while averaging twelve points, four rebounds and two assists per game for the Chicago Bulls.

Houston Rockets (1984-1987) 
In the 1984 off-season, Wiggins signed with the Houston Rockets, fighting for a berth in the starting lineup with Lewis Lloyd. In late 1986, however, after the Rockets appeared in the 1986 NBA Finals, losing to the Boston Celtics, the pair tested positive for cocaine, incurring a two-and-a-half-year suspension from the league.

Return to Houston (1989-1990) 
Both Wiggins and Lloyd were reinstated for the 1989–90 season. Wiggins appeared in 66 games and averaging 15.5 ppg but was criticized by his coach, Don Chaney, for his defense. His playing time decreased after Houston traded for Vernon Maxwell.

Philadelphia 76ers (1991-1992) 
After Wiggins became a free agent, no team expressed an interest in Wiggins outside the Philadelphia 76ers. They had intended to sign Wiggins to their roster in November 1990, but backed out when he refused to take a complete physical including a drug test. Wiggins did not play the 1990-91 season, but the 76ers kept in touch with him and signed him to a one-year contract the following year.

The 1991-92 season was Wiggins's last in the NBA. He scored 3,877 points in his NBA career.

Greek League, CSP Limoges, Tondeña 65 Rhummasters, and minor leagues (1993-2003) 
Wiggins then went to Europe and had a notable career in the Greek League playing for Milon Nea Smyrni, Sporting Athens, and Panionios Nea Smyrni. He also appeared for CSP Limoges in the French League, the Tondeña 65 Rhummasters in the Philippine Basketball Association, and several minor league teams in the United States.

National team career
Wiggins played for the US national basketball team at the 1982 FIBA World Championship, winning the silver medal.

Coaching career 
In the 2000s Wiggins tried coaching in the lower leagues.

Personal life
Wiggins' wife, Marita Payne-Wiggins, competed for Canada in track and field at the 1984 Summer Olympics, winning two silver medals. Since 2002, their family has resided in Vaughan, Ontario, Canada. Wiggins' youngest son, Andrew was selected first overall in the 2014 NBA draft by the Cleveland Cavaliers.  Wiggins' oldest son, Mitchell Jr. played for Southeastern University and his middle son Nicholas Wiggins plays professionally. Both Mitchell Jr. and Nick were drafted by the Harlem Globetrotters in 2014. Wiggins also has three daughters: Stephanie, Angelica, and Taya.

See also
 List of second-generation National Basketball Association players

References

External links

1959 births
Living people
African-American basketball players
American emigrants to Canada
American expatriate basketball people in France
American expatriate basketball people in Greece
American expatriate basketball people in Italy
American expatriate basketball people in the Philippines
American men's basketball players
Barangay Ginebra San Miguel players
Basketball players from North Carolina
Chicago Bulls players
Clemson Tigers men's basketball players
Doping cases in basketball
Florida State Seminoles men's basketball players
Fort Wayne Fury players
Houston Rockets players
Indiana Pacers draft picks
Junior college men's basketball players in the United States
Limoges CSP players
Milon B.C. players
National Basketball Association players banned for drug offenses
Oklahoma City Cavalry players
Panionios B.C. players
People from Kinston, North Carolina
People from Vaughan
Philadelphia 76ers players
Philippine Basketball Association imports
Quad City Thunder players
Shooting guards
Sporting basketball players
United States men's national basketball team players
21st-century African-American people
20th-century African-American sportspeople
1982 FIBA World Championship players